Rytidocarpus is a genus of flowering plants belonging to the family Brassicaceae.

Its native range is Morocco.

Species:
 Rytidocarpus moricandioides Coss.

References

Brassicaceae
Brassicaceae genera